Ramarajyadalli Rakshasaru (Kannada: ರಾಮರಾಜ್ಯದಲ್ಲಿ ರಾಕ್ಷಸರು) is a 1990 Indian Kannada film,  directed by  D. Rajendra Babu and produced by K. C. N. Mohan. The film stars Shankar Nag, Anant Nag, Sonika Gil and Gayathri in the lead roles. The film has musical score by M. Ranga Rao.

Cast

Shankar Nag
Anant Nag
Sonika Gil
Gayathri
Shashikumar
Doddanna
Sudheer
Ayyappa
Lakshman
Prakash Raj
Pandari Bai
Abhinaya
Sihikahi Geetha
Baby Rekha
Ramesh Bhat
Sadashiva Brahmavar
Bank Janardhan
Krishne Gowda
Girija Lokesh
Shani Mahadevappa
M. S. Karanth
Negro Johnny

References

1990 films
1990s Kannada-language films
Films scored by M. Ranga Rao
Films directed by D. Rajendra Babu